Xenon oxytetrafluoride is an inorganic chemical compound.

 +  →  +  + 

As are most xenon oxides, it is extremely reactive and unstable, and hydrolyses in water to give dangerously hazardous and corrosive products, including hydrogen fluoride:

2 + 4 → 2 + 8 + 3

In addition, some ozone and fluorine is formed.

Reactions

 +  →  + 2
 +  →  + 2

The  formed is a dangerous explosive, decomposing explosively to Xe and :
2 → 2 + 3

In its liquid form,  exhibits amphoteric behaviour, forming complexes with both strong Lewis bases like  and strong Lewis acids like .

External links

References

Oxyfluorides
Xenon(VI) compounds